Belfast Upper is a barony in County Antrim, Northern Ireland. To its east lies the barony of Belfast and Belfast Lough, and it is bordered by five other baronies: Belfast Lower to the north-east; Antrim Upper to the north-west; Massereene Lower to the west; Massereene Upper to the south-west; and Castlereagh Upper to the south. The Forth River flows through both Belfast Upper and Lower. The most prominent hills in the barony are Black Hill and Lyle's Hill.

List of settlements
Below is a list of settlements in Belfast Upper:

Cities
Belfast (split with barony of Belfast Lower)

Towns and villages
Lambeg
Milltown
Templepatrick

Population centres
Andersonstown
Ballysillan
Carr's Glen
Cavehill
Donegall Pass
Deerpark
Falls
Finaghy
Fortwilliam
Glenard
Holylands
Jennymount
Parkmount
Riverdale
Sandy Row
Seymour Hill
Shankill
Suffolk
Village
Windsor
Whiterock
Woodvale

List of civil parishes
Below is a list of civil parishes in Belfast Upper:
Ballymartin (split with barony of Belfast Lower)
Derriaghy (also partly in barony of Massereene Upper)
Drumbeg
Lambeg (split with barony of Massereene Upper)
Shankill (split with barony of Belfast Lower)
Templepatrick (split with barony of Belfast Lower)

References

 
Clandeboye